Michel Zimmermann (born 1 January 1960) is a Belgian hurdler. He competed in the men's 400 metres hurdles at the 1984 Summer Olympics.

The Belgian tennis player Kimberley Zimmermann is his daughter.

References

1960 births
Living people
Athletes (track and field) at the 1984 Summer Olympics
Belgian male hurdlers
Olympic athletes of Belgium
Place of birth missing (living people)